Per August Ölander (1824–1886) was a Swedish composer. He is mainly remembered for his opera Blenda.

References

1824 births
1886 deaths